{{DISPLAYTITLE:SN1 reaction}}
The SN1 reaction is a substitution reaction in organic chemistry, the name of which refers to the Hughes-Ingold symbol of the mechanism. "SN" stands for "nucleophilic substitution", and the "1" says that the rate-determining step is unimolecular. Thus, the rate equation is often shown as having first-order dependence on the substrate and zero-order dependence on the nucleophile. This relationship holds for situations where the amount of nucleophile is much greater than that of the intermediate. Instead, the rate equation may be more accurately described using steady-state kinetics.  The reaction involves a carbocation intermediate and is commonly seen in reactions of secondary or tertiary alkyl halides under strongly basic conditions or, under strongly acidic conditions, with secondary or tertiary alcohols. With primary and secondary alkyl halides, the alternative SN2 reaction occurs. In inorganic chemistry, the SN1 reaction is often known as the dissociative substitution. This dissociation pathway is well-described by the cis effect. A reaction mechanism was first proposed by Christopher Ingold et al. in 1940. This reaction does not depend much on the strength of the nucleophile, unlike the SN2 mechanism. This type of mechanism involves two steps. The first step is the ionization of alkyl halide in the presence of aqueous acetone or ethyl alcohol. This step provides a carbocation as an intermediate.

In the first step of SN1 mechanism, a carbocation is formed which is planar and hence attack of nucleophile (second step) may occur from either side to give a racemic product, but actually complete racemization does not take place. This is because the nucleophilic species attacks the carbocation even before the departing halides ion has moved sufficiently away from the carbocation. The negatively charged halide ion shields the carbocation from being attacked on the front side, and backside attack, which leads to inversion of configuration, is preferred. Thus the actual product no doubt consists of a mixture of enantiomers but the enantiomers with inverted configuration would predominate and complete racemization does not occurs.

Mechanism
An example of a reaction taking place with an SN1 reaction mechanism is the hydrolysis of tert-butyl bromide forming tert-butanol:

This SN1 reaction takes place in three steps:

 Formation of a tert-butyl carbocation by separation of a leaving group (a bromide anion) from the carbon atom: this step is slow.

 Nucleophilic attack: the carbocation reacts with the nucleophile. If the nucleophile is a neutral molecule (i.e. a solvent) a third step is required to complete the reaction. When the solvent is water, the intermediate is an oxonium ion. This reaction step is fast.

 Deprotonation: Removal of a proton on the protonated nucleophile by water acting as a base forming the alcohol and a hydronium ion. This reaction step is fast.

Rate law 
Although the rate law of the SN1 reaction is often regarded as being first order in alkyl halide and zero order in nucleophile, this is a simplification that holds true only under certain conditions. While it, too, is an approximation, the rate law derived from the steady state approximation (SSA) provides more insight into the kinetic behavior of the SN1 reaction. Consider the following reaction scheme for the mechanism shown above:
Though a relatively stable tertiary carbocation, tert-butyl cation is a high-energy species that is present only at very low concentration and cannot be directly observed under normal conditions. Thus, the SSA can be applied to this species:

 (1) Steady state assumption: d[tBu+]/dt = 0 = k1[tBuBr] – k–1[tBu+][Br–] – k2[tBu+][H2O] 
 (2) Concentration of t-butyl cation, based on steady state assumption: [tBu+] = k1[tBuBr]/(k–1[Br–] + k2[H2O])   
 (3) Overall reaction rate, assuming rapid final step: d[tBuOH]/dt = k2[tBu+][H2O] 
 (4) Steady state rate law, by plugging (2) into (3): d[tBuOH]/dt = k1k2[tBuBr][H2O]/(k–1[Br–] + k2[H2O])

Under normal synthetic conditions, the entering nucleophile is more nucleophilic than the leaving group and is present in excess.  Moreover, kinetic experiments are often conducted under initial rate conditions (5 to 10% conversion) and without the addition of bromide, so [Br–] is negligible.  For these reasons, k–1[Br–] ≪ k2[H2O] often holds.  Under these conditions, the SSA rate law reduces to 

rate = d[tBuOH]/dt = k1k2[tBuBr][H2O]/(k2[H2O]) = k1[tBuBr], 

the simple first-order rate law described in introductory textbooks.  Under these conditions, the concentration of the nucleophile does not affect the rate of the reaction, and changing the nucleophile (e.g. from H2O to MeOH) does not affect the reaction rate, though the product is, of course, different.  In this regime, the first step (ionization of the alkyl bromide) is slow, rate-determining, and irreversible, while the second step (nucleophilic addition) is fast and kinetically invisible.

However, under certain conditions, non-first-order reaction kinetics can be observed.  In particular, when a large concentration of bromide is present while the concentration of water is limited, the reverse of the first step becomes important kinetically. As the SSA rate law indicates, under these conditions there is a fractional (between zeroth and first order) dependence on [H2O], while there is a negative fractional order dependence on [Br–].  Thus, SN1 reactions are often observed to slow down when an exogenous source of the leaving group (in this case, bromide) is added to the reaction mixture. This is known as the common ion effect and the observation of this effect is evidence for an SN1 mechanism (although the absence of a common ion effect does not rule it out).

Scope 
The SN1 mechanism tends to dominate when the central carbon atom is surrounded by bulky groups because such groups sterically hinder the SN2 reaction. Additionally, bulky substituents on the central carbon increase the rate of carbocation formation because of the relief of steric strain that occurs. The resultant carbocation is also stabilized by both inductive stabilization and hyperconjugation from attached alkyl groups. The Hammond–Leffler postulate suggests that this, too, will increase the rate of carbocation formation. The SN1 mechanism therefore dominates in reactions at tertiary alkyl centers.

An example of a reaction proceeding in a SN1 fashion is the synthesis of 2,5-dichloro-2,5-dimethylhexane from the corresponding diol with concentrated hydrochloric acid:

As the alpha and beta substitutions increase with respect to leaving groups, the reaction is diverted from SN2 to SN1.

Stereochemistry
The carbocation intermediate formed in the reaction's rate determining step (RDS) is an sp2 hybridized carbon with trigonal planar molecular geometry. This allows two different ways for the nucleophilic attack, one on either side of the planar molecule. If neither approach is favored, then these two ways occur equally, yielding a racemic mixture of enantiomers if the reaction takes place at a stereocenter. This is illustrated below in the SN1 reaction of S-3-chloro-3-methylhexane with an iodide ion, which yields a racemic mixture of 3-iodo-3-methylhexane:

However, an excess of one stereoisomer can be observed, as the leaving group can remain in proximity to the carbocation intermediate for a short time and block nucleophilic attack. This stands in contrast to the SN2 mechanism, which is a stereospecific mechanism where stereochemistry is always inverted as the nucleophile comes in from the rear side of the leaving group.

Side reactions

Two common side reactions are elimination reactions and carbocation rearrangement. If the reaction is performed under warm or hot conditions (which favor an increase in entropy), E1 elimination is likely to predominate, leading to formation of an alkene. At lower temperatures, SN1 and E1 reactions are competitive reactions and it becomes difficult to favor one over the other. Even if the reaction is performed cold, some alkene may be formed. If an attempt is made to perform an SN1 reaction using a strongly basic nucleophile such as hydroxide or methoxide ion, the alkene will again be formed, this time via an E2 elimination. This will be especially true if the reaction is heated. Finally, if the carbocation intermediate can rearrange to a more stable carbocation, it will give a product derived from the more stable carbocation rather than the simple substitution product.

Solvent effects

Since the SN1 reaction involves formation of an unstable carbocation intermediate in the rate-determining step (RDS), anything that can facilitate this process will speed up the reaction. The normal solvents of choice are both polar (to stabilize ionic intermediates in general) and protic solvents (to solvate the leaving group in particular). Typical polar protic solvents include water and alcohols, which will also act as nucleophiles, and the process is known as solvolysis.

The Y scale correlates solvolysis reaction rates of any solvent (k) with that of a standard solvent (80% v/v ethanol/water) (k0) through

with m a reactant constant (m = 1 for tert-butyl chloride) and Y a solvent parameter. For example, 100% ethanol gives Y = −2.3, 50% ethanol in water Y = +1.65 and 15% concentration Y = +3.2.

See also 
Arrow pushing
Nucleophilic acyl substitution
Neighbouring group participation
SN2 reaction

References

External links 
 Diagrams: Frostburg State University
 Exercise: the University of Maine

Nucleophilic substitution reactions
Reaction mechanisms